The following is a list of things and places named after American educator Booker T. Washington.

Places

Parks
 Booker T. Washington State Park – situated on the shores of Chickamauga Lake in Tennessee
 Booker T. Washington State Park – former state park in West Virginia 
 Booker T. Washington Park – Midland, Texas
 Booker T. Washington Park – Charlottesville, Virginia
 Booker T. Washington Park - Altoona, Pennsylvania
 Booker T. Washington Center - Altoona, Pennsylvania
 Booker T.                     Washington Park – on the campus of West Virginia State University

Schools

Colleges
 Booker T. Washington Junior College in Pensacola, Florida

High schools
 Booker T. Washington Magnet High School in Montgomery, Alabama
 Booker T. Washington High School in Tuskegee, Alabama
 Booker T. Washington Public Charter School in Washington, District of Columbia 
 Booker T. Washington High School (Miami, Florida) 
 Booker T. Washington High School (Pensacola, Florida) 
 Booker T. Washington High School (Atlanta, Georgia), listed on the National Register of Historic Places (NRHP) in Fulton County
 Booker T. Washington High School (Shreveport, Louisiana) 
 Booker T. Washington High School (Tulsa, Oklahoma) 
 Booker T. Washington High School in Columbia, South Carolina
 Booker T. Washington High School (Memphis, Tennessee) 
 Booker T. Washington High School for the Performing and Visual Arts in Dallas, Texas
 Booker T. Washington High School (Houston, Texas)
 Booker T. Washington High School (Norfolk, Virginia) 
 Booker T. Washington High School (London, West Virginia), listed on the NRHP in Kanawha County
 Booker T. Washington High School (Rocky Mount, NC)

Middle schools
 Booker T. Washington Middle School (Baltimore) — Baltimore, Maryland
 Booker T. Washington Middle School (Newport News) — Newport News, Virginia
 Booker T. Washington Middle School (New York) — New York City, New York
 Booker T. Washington Elementary School (Hobbs) — Hobbs, New Mexico

Past schools
 Booker T. Washington High School (New Orleans) – considered a historic landmark; abandoned after 2005's Hurricane Katrina. 
 Booker T. Washington High School in Wichita Falls, Texas – closed in 1969, later serving as Washington-Jackson Math & Science Center.
 Booker T. Washington High School for Coloreds in Staunton, Virginia – from 1936 to 1966, now serving as the Booker T. Washington Community Center.
 Booker T. Washington Middle School in Wichita Falls, Texas – closed in 1970.
 Booker T. Washington Middle School in Tampa, Florida – closed in 2004. (Note: Tampa has a B.T. Washington Elementary School.)

Other things

Facilities, other than public schools
 Booker T. Washington Institute at West Virginia State University
 Booker T. Washington Bridge, over the Hampton River near Washington's alma mater, Hampton University of Virginia

Vehicles
 SS Booker T. Washington, World War II liberty ship
 Booker T. Washington, 1930s airplane named at the request of Robert Russa Moton, Washington's successor

Geographical features
 Mount Booker, in Washington (state)

References

Washington, Booker T